Balthazar is a  French crime-thriller drama television series created by Clothilde Jamin and Clélia Constantine, broadcast in Belgium since November 20, 2018, on La Une, and, in France, since December 6, 2018, on TF1. The series was renewed for the last season in 2023.

It was one of the 10 highest-rated dramas in France in 2018.

Plot
Raphaël Balthazar, the most gifted forensic pathologist of his generation, knows how to make the dead speak. He imagines the ghosts of the deceased people he has seen, asking them questions about how they would have died, their private lives, or what they should do. He becomes the teammate of police commander Hélène Bach (played by Hélène de Fougerolles). Both face the most complex murder investigations while he secretly tries to solve the murder of a person close to him.

Main cast
Forensic Institute

Tomer Sisley: Forensic pathologist Raphaël Balthazar
Philypa Phoenix: Fatim Saghi
Côme Levin: Eddy Drouhot
Caterina Murino: Olivia Vésinet (S4-)

OPJ

Hélène de Fougerolles: Captain Hélène Bach (S1-3)
Yannig Samot: Lieutenant Jérôme Delgado
Constance Labbé: Captain Camille Costes (S4-)

Raphaël Balthazar family

Pauline Cheviller: Lise, partner of Balthazar murdered by a serial killer

Hélène Bach family

Aliocha Itovich: Antoine Bach, husband of Hélène  (S1-3)
Gabriel Caballero: Hugo Bach, son of Hélène (S1-3)
Aminthe Audiard: Manon Bach, daughter of Hélène (S1-3)

Season 5

Hugo Bardin: Paloma

References

External links

French crime drama television series
Serial drama television series
2018 French television series debuts
French-language television shows
Thriller television series
Thriller web series
TF1 original programming
French web series
La Une original programming